Moa Matthis, (born 21 March 1966) is a Swedish literature critic and author. She writes for Dagens Nyheter, and she writes articles and books mostly for a feminist angle.

Bibliography (selection) 
Moa Matthis: "--- och nu och alla dagar prisar jag så mycket jag nånsin förmår Eros makt och manliga sinne" - om det manliga begärets betydelse för kvinnorna, i Claudia Lindén och Ulrika Milles (redaktörer): Feministisk bruksanvisning, Norstedts 1995,  
Anne Hedén, Ulrika Milles och Moa Matthis: Över alla hinder, Bonniers 2000
Moa Matthis : Orientalism på svenska, Ordfront i samarbete med Re:Orient 2005
Moa Matthis: Feminister och pionjärer. Om fyra kvinnliga författare och äventyrare, Norstedts, 2006,  
Moa Matthis: Maria Eleonora: drottningen som sa nej, Bonniers 2010,

References

External links 

Living people
1966 births
Swedish women writers